Mussidan is a commune in the Dordogne department in Nouvelle-Aquitaine in southwestern France. Mussidan station has rail connections to Bordeaux, Périgueux, Brive-la-Gaillarde and Limoges.

Population

Roundup of 16 January 1944

On 16 January 1944, 35 hostages were arrested by the Germans for acts of resistance. They were deported to German work camps.

Battle and executions of 11 June 1944

On 11 June 1944 Francs-Tireurs et Partisans  destroyed a German armoured train at Mussidan station. During the fight, eight guerrillas and the train guard were killed. At the same time a convoy of the powerful 11th Panzer Division of the Wehrmacht from Bordeaux arrived. The guerrillas were obliged to withdraw.
As a reprisal, a detachment of the Gestapo from Périgueux led by Second Lieutenant Michaël Hambrecht, reinforced by a platoon of the Carlingue led by Alexandre Villaplane, head of one of the five sections of the North African Brigade and former captain of the France football team at the 1930 World Cup in Uruguay, 350 men over the age of sixteen from the city and its surroundings were arrested. The village was plundered by the North Africans. In the evening, 47 civilians were shot near the town hall; five others were massacred in the street, including Raoul Grassin, the mayor of the town, and a councillor. Eight boys were under 18. Only two people survived despite their serious injuries. The Mussidan massacre constitutes the largest massacre of civilians committed in the Dordogne during the Second World War, the tenth largest in France. 115 inhabitants were deported.

These sufferings earned Mussidan the award of the 1939-1945 war cross on 11 November 1948, a distinction also awarded to eighteen other municipalities in the Dordogne.

International relations
It is twinned with:
 Woodbridge, Suffolk, England
 Vigy, France; since 1990

See also
Communes of the Dordogne department

References

Communes of Dordogne